AgDay is a syndicated daily half-hour television program presented in magazine format focusing on agriculture news, agribusiness, and country living.  It generally airs in early morning timeslots on stations throughout the country and also airs weekday mornings on the digital cable and satellite channel RFD-TV. It is taped at WNDU studios in South Bend, Indiana. It is hosted and produced by Clinton Griffiths.

Clinton Griffiths has been the news anchor of AgDay TV since 2010. He also serves as editor of Farm Journal, the premiere publication for U.S. agriculture. Clinton grew up in Southern New Mexico as a 10 year 4-H member, chapter FFA President and Star State Farmer. He was recently named the prestigious NAFB Farm Broadcaster of the Year.

Background
AgDay debuted on August 16, 1982. Hosted by Wayne Jenkins (WTHI-AM/FM/TV) and Bob Jenkins (ESPN), the half hour ag-report featured a national news segment, "The Helming Report" (a market segment), "Money Matters" with Jim Wilson, CPA (a financial segment), and the morning "AccuWeather Forecast Farm Weather Report" with meteorologists Terry Kelley, and Mike Nelson. The show was taped in the studios of WTHI-TV in Terre Haute, Indiana, and broadcast from the uplink facilities at WISH-TV, Indianapolis, Indiana, via video tape.  In the show's early years, the show had a Space Age theme, using fonts, logos and graphics associated with space age and/or science fiction themes, to reflect the show's emphasis on its satellite distribution and futuristic focus.  AgDay would move away from these themes in the late 1980s.

The original anchor team Wayne and Bob Jenkins, were not related. Wayne a long time farm director and weatherman for WTHI-TV, would later give the weather reports as the show evolved. Bob Jenkins was the farm director for Indianapolis radio station WIRE, and was a broadcaster on the fledgling cable network ESPN, while also working for the Indianapolis Motor Speedway Radio Network. The anchor team was supported by reporters Jayne Dula, Ralph Seely, Bill Pemble (USDA) and Craig Maurer (Washington, D.C., bureau chief); producer Al Dowbnia; director Jay Strasser; coordinating producer Jim Berry; field producer Heidi Gutman; additional meteorological support from Valarie Jones and Barbara Robertson; production manager Rod Garvin; production assistants Shawn Terrell, Don Green and Kevin Badeaux; camera operators Bob Baskerville and Lucie Horst; graphics Lonnie Bailey; audio Bart Pearson and John Matthews; and secretarial support by Lynn Shanks and Julie Mounts. It was originally the property of Creative Farm Media and Creative Media Productions, and was controlled by executive producers Gerald Badeaux and Neal Nussbaum.

In December 1982 the show moved its office and production to Indianapolis, producing and up-linking AgDay from the studios of WFYI TV. From their new offices at Keystone at the Crossing, it launched into covering the agriculture around the world, traveling to Canada, Rome, Brussels, Paris, and Hong Kong to bring US viewers international developments in key farm issues of the day. It also relied on a network of stringer reporters and videographers to gather news from across the US. As Bob Jenkins slowly moved away from farm broadcasting to concentrate on motor-sports coverage for ESPN and to anchor "Speedweek", reporter Brian Baxter replaced him as the co-anchor, with Bob Jenkins appearing from time to time as his ESPN schedule would allow. Jayne Dula also departed and was replaced with Kathy Shew and Lisa Jackson.

AgDay changed production facilities several more times as the staff evolved. Jim Berry, Shawn Terrell and later Brian Baxter would serve as the show's producer. AgDay's production moved to Nova Production Studios, then to WPDS (later becoming WXIN), and eventually back to WFYI Television. A bankruptcy eventually forced the split and sale of assets.  This put the program back under the control of Neal Nussbaum, who decided to re-locate the production to WLFI-TV in Lafayette, Indiana.  At that point, the remaining Ag Day staff, including anchors Wayne Jenkins and Brian Baxter, remained at WFYI to create and produce a new syndicated program called the "Morning Ag Report".  Following the stint at WLFI-TV, with Garth Clark anchoring the show, the "AgDay" production was again moved, this time to South Bend's WNDU with entirely new staff and on air-talent, with one key exception: former production assistant Don Green returned after leaving the show at the time of its initial move to Indianapolis, to produce the new-look show, featuring Al Pell. AgDay has been based at WNDU ever since, with their weather department providing the forecasts seen on the show. Mike Hoffman served as the show's chief meteorologist beginning in 2001; in 2021, following a transition period, Hoffman retired and was succeeded by Matt Engelbrecht, who left shortly thereafter as Matt Yarosweick took over as full time meteorologist in early 2022.

Publisher Farm Journal Media acquired AgDay in 1998, merging production with its own weekly farm newsmagazine U.S. Farm Report under its ownership.

The show is distributed on RFD TV and through a network of broadcast stations.

Format
The first segment consists of daily news information related to farm policy as well as producer and consumer news, usually including a brief teaser of weather.

The second segment is devoted to agribusiness, and contains market news as well as a market discussion between Griffiths and a professional involved in agriculture marketing and trading.  Tuesday's shows also contain a cotton report from the National Cotton Council.

A weather forecast occupies the middle segment, led by meteorologist Matt Yarosweick. The report focuses on drought conditions as well as precipitation estimates, and also includes daily temperatures and a look at the jet stream for the week ahead.  Monday's weather also includes a 30-day outlook for temperatures and precipitation.  The segment concludes with daily forecasts for three random small towns each day.

The fourth segment is "In The Country".  This features a report often from either colleges of agriculture or government agencies on programs or events and human interest stories occurring throughout farm country.

The final segment varies from day-to-day.  Monday, Wednesday, and Friday's shows contain "Ag For Your Health", a report on a health breakthrough or results of a study.  This report is often produced from the Ohio State University hospital system.  Tuesday's show contains "Ag on the Net", a visual tour of a website related to farming, nutrition, health, etc.  Thursday's show contains a garden report, often "Gardening In the Zone" produced at Iowa State University.

On selected holidays such as Thanksgiving, Christmas, and New Year's Day, special AgDay programs will air, highlighting features and holiday-related stories from farm country.  The Thanksgiving special is known as "Harvest of Thanks", and the Christmas special is titled "Christmas in the Country."

AgDay is the sister program of U.S. Farm Report, a weekly farm program also produced at WNDU.   Pell and Hoffman also appear in this show along with host Tyne Morgan, who in turn reports for AgDay.

AgDay episodes are available free of charge via the Internet, through their own website on demand and by way of the live video streams of select affiliates.

External links
Official website

Agriculture in the United States
Environmental television
1982 American television series debuts
First-run syndicated television programs in the United States
RFD-TV original programming